Regis School may refer to:
 The Regis School,  Bognor Regis, West Sussex, England
 The Regis School of the Sacred Heart, Spring Branch, Houston, Texas, United States

See also
 Regis High School (disambiguation)